is a volcanic, deserted island located in the Philippine Sea approximately  off the coast of Aogashima, near the southern end of the Izu archipelago, Japan.

Geography
The island is estimated to have been created by a volcanic eruption around 20,000 years ago. In the immediate vicinity are numerous exposed and awash rocks. Due to its shape and heavy seas it is difficult to disembark on the island, although at times fishermen are known to have landed. The abundance of fish in the surrounding waters have made it attractive for both sport and commercial fishing.

History
The island has been known by Japanese fishermen and mariners from an early time. The islet has subsequently sunk beneath sea level due to erosion. From 1974 to 1977, a series of underwater eruptions have been recorded, discoloring water in the area. In November 1991, a fishing vessel reported that a large section of the island's northern face had collapsed, resulting in a significant change in its profile. Further changes to the island's profile were recorded after 1992 earthquakes.

Sumisu-tō is administratively part of Tokyo Metropolis.

See also

 Izu Islands
 Desert island
 List of islands
 List of volcanoes in Japan
 List of islands in Japan

References

External links

Japan Coast Guard submarine volcano database 

Izu Islands
Uninhabited islands of Japan
Extinct volcanoes
Stacks of Japan
Islands of Tokyo